Pentagon Federal Credit Union, widely known by its abbreviated name PenFed, is a United States federal credit union headquartered in McLean, Virginia, chartered and regulated under the authority of the National Credit Union Administration (NCUA).  PenFed is the nation's third largest federal credit union, with assets of $25 billion and more than 1.8 million members as of July 2018.

In addition to a variety of loans, savings, and deposit accounts, PenFed also offers credit cards and other financial services.

Membership

Pentagon Federal Credit Union historically had a limited membership to individuals sharing the common bond defined in its credit union charter, mostly membership in organizations related to national defense. In 2018, PenFed acquired the New York-chartered Progressive Credit Union, which had failed due to taxi medallion loans in New York City but which had an open field of membership charter allowing anyone nationwide to join.

A list of some past eligible memberships include the following:

 Active duty members from the U.S. Army, U.S. Navy, U.S. Marine Corps, U.S. Air Force, U.S. Space Force, and U.S. Coast Guard.
 Reserve and National Guard members. 
 Retired members of Active Duty, Reserves, and the National Guard.
 Current and retired civilian employees of the Department of Defense.
 Current and retired agents of the Department of Homeland Security 
 Current and retired employees of the United States Public Health Service
 Employees and volunteers of the American Red Cross
 Members of the National Military Family Association
 Members of the Air Force Association
 Members of the United States Coast Guard Auxiliary
 Members of the Military Officers Association of America
 Members of Paralyzed Veterans of America
 Members of the United States Army Warrant Officers Association 
 Members of the Marine Corps League
 Members of the Navy League of the United States
 Members of the Reserve Officers Association
 Members of Jewish War Veterans of the United States of America
 Members of Veterans of Foreign Wars
 Members of Vietnam Veterans of America
 Pentagon building employees
 Employees of the Transpotomac Plaza or Canal Center in Alexandria, VA 
 Individuals who are assigned to, work at, or receive benefits from, any defense or military-based institution
 Family members of those in the field of membership, including: grandparents, parents, spouse, siblings, children (including adopted, foster and stepchildren), grandchildren, and household members
 Family members and employees of Pentagon Federal Credit Union itself

Competition
PenFed is among a few financial services companies that specialize in serving the military—it competes with other military credit unions, such as Navy Federal Credit Union, as well as with some large banks, including Bank of America-Military Bank and USAA.

Locations
Branches are located in the Washington, D.C., area (including Maryland and Virginia); California; Florida; Georgia; Hawaii; Nebraska; New Jersey; New Mexico; New York; North Carolina; Texas; and at military bases in Guam, Japan, Portugal, and Puerto Rico.

Pentagon Federal operates several call centers in Omaha, Nebraska; Papillion, Nebraska; Eugene, Oregon; and San Antonio, Texas.
 
In 2003, Pentagon Federal joined Allpoint, a surcharge-free network of automated teller machines.

Expansion
In 2017, Pentagon Federal initiated merger talks with Scranton, Pennsylvania-based Valor Credit Union. Valor reported net losses of $2.4 million and $2.25 million in last year’s second and third quarters, which initiated talks of merger with PenFed. The merger was approved by Valor members, and on April 1, 2017, Valor officially merged with PenFed.

In February 2019, McGraw-Hill Federal Credit Union announced plans to merge with PenFed, completing to convert customers to those of PenFed on May 1, 2019. The former McGraw-Hill branch in East Windsor, New Jersey, currently operates as a PenFed branch as of September 2019.

PenFed Foundation 
The PenFed Foundation was founded in 2001 by leadership from PenFed Credit Union.

The mission of the PenFed Foundation for Military Heroes is to empower military service members, veterans and their communities with the skills and resources to realize financial stability and opportunity.

The PenFed Foundation has helped more than 140,000 military families since 2001.

In April 2019, four-star Retired General John W. “Mick” Nicholson, Jr. became president of the PenFed Foundation, serving in this capacity until January 2022. 

In March 2020, the PenFed Foundation became the first veteran service organization to launch a COVID-19 emergency relief program open to all service members and veterans and received 6,000 applications in four days.

In June 2020, CNN included PenFed Foundation in its list of nonprofits to support during the COVID-19 pandemic.

The PenFed Foundation was recognized as one of Survey Monkey’s top 4 organizations providing COVID-19 relief.

The PenFed Foundation was also honored as the Nonprofit of the Year in July 2020 by the Northern Virginia Chamber of Commerce.

In August 2020, Business Insider recommended PenFed Foundation as one of 8 nonprofits to donate to during the COVID-19 pandemic.

In August 2020, PenFed Foundation was also named a Top 20 Nonprofit Champion by Military Spouse Magazine.

References

External links

Official website
National Credit Union Administration

Credit unions based in Virginia
Companies based in McLean, Virginia
American companies established in 1935
Banks established in 1935
1935 establishments in Virginia
Privately held companies of the United States